Kydgunj is a township of Prayag Raj, Uttar Pradesh, India

Neighbourhoods in Allahabad